Sumac is an unincorporated community in Murray County, in the U.S. state of Georgia.

History
The community takes its name from nearby Sumac Creek. A variant spelling is "Sumach". A post office called Sumach was established in 1878, and remained in operation until 1907.

The town was hit by a tornado on April 12, 2020, which killed eight people in and around the town and was rated EF2.

References

Unincorporated communities in Georgia (U.S. state)
Unincorporated communities in Murray County, Georgia